Elachista casascoensis is a moth of the family Elachistidae. It is found in Italy.

References

casascoensis
Moths described in 1992
Endemic fauna of Italy
Moths of Europe